Nueva Era Basket Club (in English: New Era Basketball Club) is an Equatorial Guinean basketball team based in Malabo. The team was founded in 2021 by a group of basketball enthusiast, led by Jules Cesar Micha Nfono. The establishment of the Basketball Africa League (BAL) in the same year inspired them to provide a club for the youth of national basketball.

In 2021, the team signed Spanish coach Ignacio Duran and two foreign players in David Stachoskij and Daniel Saunders. Nueva Era won the national championship in 2022.

Nueva Era played in the 2023 BAL qualification, and won one game in the first round against Espoir, becoming the first Equatoguinean team to win a BAL qualification game and to advance past the first round.

Honours 
National Basketball League

 Champions (2): 2020–21, 2021–22
June 5th Basketball Tournament

 Winners (1): 2021

Players

2022 roster

References 

Basketball teams established in 2021
Basketball teams in Equatorial Guinea
Road to BAL teams
Sport in Malabo